The Thin Line Between is the fifth studio album by Canadian death metal band Neuraxis. It was released on July 15, 2008, by Prosthetic Records. The album was the first studio album recorded with guitarist William Seghers and vocalist Alex Leblanc, who replaced Steven Henry and Ian Campbell respectively. In April 2009, the band released a music video for "Darkness Prevails". Neuraxis uploaded three videos of the recording sessions on their official YouTube channel.

Bassist Yan Theil and drummer Tommy Mckinnon left some time after the release of the album. The departure of Theil left Neuraxis with no remaining founding members. Robin Milley is now the longest-serving member of the band.

Track listing

Personnel

Neuraxis
 Alex Leblanc – vocals
 Robin Milley – guitar
 Will Seghers – guitar
 Yan Theil – bass
 Tommy McKinnon – drums

Additional musicians
 Luc Lemay – vocals on "The Thin Line Between" and "Oracle"
 Chris Alsop – vocals on "The All and the Nothing"
 Sebastian Croteau – vocals on "Standing Despite..."

Production
 Jef Fortin – production, mixing, sound engineering
 Alan Douches – mastering

Additional personnel
 Dennis Sibeijn – artwork, layout
 Fred Laroche – photography

References

2008 albums
Neuraxis (band) albums
Prosthetic Records albums